In Concert-Carnegie Hall is a live album by American guitarist George Benson featuring a performance recorded at Carnegie Hall in 1975 and released on the CTI label in 1976. The CD reissue added one bonus track and reordered the selections as presented in concert.

Reception
The Allmusic review states " this is a solid "live" effort with Benson cooking on all burners... In retrospect, listening to this record in the 21st century, it's difficult to imagine Benson making the switch from a classy guitar firebrand to a pop star so quickly".

Track listing
All compositions by George Benson except as indicated
 Introduction - 1:17 Bonus track on CD reissue
 "Take Five" (Paul Desmond) - 5:37
 "Summertime" (George Gershwin, DuBose Heyward) - 7:24
 "Gone" - 10:28
 "Sky Dive" (Freddie Hubbard) - 6:57 Bonus track on CD reissue
 "Octane" - 10:16

Personnel
George Benson - guitar, vocals 
Hubert Laws - flute
Ronnie Foster - keyboards
Wayne Dockery - bass
Marvin Chappell - drums
Bernard Fennell - cello
Overdubbed: 
Johnny Griggs, Ray Armando - percussion
Will Lee - bass
Steve Gadd, Andy Newmark - drums
Unknown string section arranged and conducted by David Matthews

References

CTI Records live albums
George Benson albums
1976 live albums
Albums produced by Creed Taylor
Albums arranged by David Matthews (keyboardist)
Albums recorded at Van Gelder Studio
Albums recorded at Carnegie Hall